Portland Head Light is a historic lighthouse in Cape Elizabeth, Maine. The light station sits on a head of land at the entrance of the primary shipping channel into Portland Harbor, which is within Casco Bay in the Gulf of Maine. Completed in 1791, it is the oldest lighthouse in  Maine. The light station is automated, and the tower, beacon, and foghorn are maintained by the United States Coast Guard, while the former lighthouse keepers' house is a maritime museum within Fort Williams Park.

History
Construction began in 1787 at the directive of George Washington, and was completed on January 10, 1791, using a fund of $1,500, established by him. Whale oil lamps were originally used for illumination. In 1855, following formation of the Lighthouse Board, a fourth-order Fresnel lens was installed; that lens was replaced by a second-order Fresnel lens, which was replaced later by an aerobeacon in 1958. That lens was replaced with a DCB-224 aerobeacon in 1991. The DCB-224 aerobeacon is still in use.

In 1787, while Maine was still part of the state of Massachusetts, George Washington engaged two masons from the town of Falmouth (modern-day Portland), Jonathan Bryant and John Nichols, and instructed them to take charge of the construction of a lighthouse on Portland Head. Washington reminded them that the early government was poor, and said that the materials used to build the lighthouse should be taken from the fields and shores, materials which could be handled nicely when hauled by oxen on a drag. The original plans called for the tower to be 58 feet tall. When the masons completed this task, they climbed to the top of the tower and realized that it would not be visible beyond the headlands to the south, so it was raised another 20 feet.

The tower was built of rubblestone, and Washington gave the masons four years to build it. While it was under construction in 1789, the federal government was being formed, and for a while it looked as though the lighthouse would not be finished. Following passage of their ninth law, the first congress made an appropriation and authorized the Secretary of the Treasury, Alexander Hamilton, to inform the mechanics that they could go on with the completion of the tower. On August 10, 1790, the second session of congress appropriated a sum not to exceed $1500, and under the direction of the President, "to cause the said lighthouse to be finished and completed accordingly."  The tower was completed during 1790 and first lit January 10, 1791.

During the American Civil War, raids on shipping in and out of Portland Harbor became commonplace, and because of the necessity for ships at sea to sight Portland Head Light as soon as possible, the tower was raised 20 more feet. The current keepers' house was built in 1891. When Halfway Rock Light was built, Portland Head Light was considered less important, and in 1883, the tower was shortened  and a weaker fourth-order Fresnel lens was added. The former height and second-order Fresnel lens were restored in 1885 following mariners' complaints.

The station has changed little except for the rebuilding of the whistle house in 1975 due to its having been badly damaged in a storm. The grounds and keeper's house are owned by the town of Cape Elizabeth, while the beacon and fog signal are owned and maintained by the U.S. Coast Guard as a current aid to navigation. It was added to the National Register of Historic Places as Portland Head light (sic) on April 24, 1973, reference number 73000121. The lighthouse was designated as a National Historic Civil Engineering Landmark by the  American Society of Civil Engineers in 2002.

Keepers
• Joseph K. Greenleaf (1791–1795) As a patriot, he was appointed by George Washington.
• David Duncan (1796)
• Barzillai Delano (1796–1820)
• Joshua Freeman (1820–1840)
• Richard Lee (1840–1849)
• John F. Watts (1849–1853)
• John W. Coolidge (1853–1854)
• James S. Williams (1854)
• James Delano (1854–1861)
• Elder M. Jordan (1861–1869)
• Joshua F. Strout (1869–1904)
• Joseph W. Strout (1904–1928)
• John W. Cameron (assistant 1904-1928, principal keeper 1928-1929)
• Frank O. Hilt (1929–1944)
• Robert Thayer Sterling (assistant 1928-1944, principal keeper 1944-1946)
• Archie McLaughlin (Coast Guard, c. 1946)
• William L. Lockhart (Coast Guard 1946-1950)
• William T. Burns (Coast Guard, 1950-1956?)
• Earle E. Benson (Coast Guard, 1952-?)
• Edward Frank (Coast Guard 1956-?)
• Weston B. Gamage Jr. (Coast Guard, c. early 1960s)
• James R Wilson (Coast Guard, 1962 - 1964)
• Armand Houde(Coast Guard officer in charge, c. 1963-1965)
• Thomas Reed (Coast Guard, 1966–1967)
• Robert Allen (Coast Guard, c. 1972)
• Kenneth A. Perry (Coast Guard,1973-1975)
• Roy Cavanaugh (Coast Guard, c. 1971-1977)
• Jerry Poliskey (Coast Guard, c. 1977)
• Ray Barbar (Coast Guard Officer-in-Charge 1978-1982)
• Marion Danna (Coast Guard Assist. Light keeper 1980-1983)
• Michael Cook (Coast Guard Officer-in-Charge 1982-1986)
• Davis Simpson (Coast Guard, ?-1989)
• Nathan Wasserstrom (Coast Guard, ?-1989)
• Cameron Ayres

Gallery

In art and popular culture
 Edward Hopper painted the lighthouse in 1927. His watercolor resides at Boston's Museum of Fine Arts.
 A snowy Portland Head Light was featured in the 1999 drama Snow Falling on Cedars, which was filmed during the Ice storm of 1998.
 The lighthouse was featured in the fifth, sixth, and seventh season of Marvel's Agents of S.H.I.E.L.D. Described as being on the shores of Lake Ontario in the show, the building housed an underground facility used by S.H.I.E.L.D. as their covert base of operations.
It was also featured on a postcard in the opening credits of National Lampoon's Vacation.

See also 
 Annie C. Maguire shipwreck
 Port of Portland, ME
 National Register of Historic Places listings in Cumberland County, Maine

References

External links

 Portland Head Light - official site
 Portland Head Light - United States Lighthouses

Lighthouses on the National Register of Historic Places in Maine
Lighthouses completed in 1791
Houses completed in 1791
Towers completed in 1791
Lighthouse museums in Maine
Museums in Cumberland County, Maine
Historic Civil Engineering Landmarks
Cape Elizabeth, Maine
Lighthouses in Cumberland County, Maine
National Register of Historic Places in Cumberland County, Maine
1791 establishments in Maine